Propetamphos is an insecticide (cockroaches, flies, ants, ticks, moths, fleas and mosquitoes) from the group of organophosphates, based on thiophosphoric acid ester. 
The molecule with formula is C10H20NO4PS has a molecular weight of 281.311 g/mol.

References

Organophosphate insecticides